Greedy is a 1994 American comedy film directed by Jonathan Lynn, written by Lowell Ganz and Babaloo Mandel, and starring Michael J. Fox, Kirk Douglas, Nancy Travis, Olivia d'Abo, Phil Hartman, Ed Begley Jr., and Colleen Camp. It tells the story of an aging wheelchair-using scrap metal tycoon whose younger relatives compete to get the inheritance when he dies.

The original music score was composed by Randy Edelman. Upon its release, the movie received a mixed reception from critics.

Plot
Joe McTeague is a wealthy, wheelchair-using scrap-metal tycoon who has to put up with his niece Patti, his nephews Carl, Frank, and Glen, and their respective spouses Ed, Nora, Tina, and Muriel. They usually named their kids after their uncle and continually suck up to him and try to outdo each other in order to inherit his 25 million dollars when he dies. With their attempts constantly failing and irritable Uncle Joe showing a decided interest in his new sexy "nurse" Molly Richardson, Frank decides to hire a private detective named Laura to bring in his brother Daniel (who turned his back on the family years ago because of their selfishness) believing if they can make up, Uncle Joe will thaw towards them.

Instead of finding Daniel, Laura finds his son Danny of whom Uncle Joe had always been especially fond. A professional bowler, Danny left the family with his father, but he accepts the cousins' invitation to return — after rolling a gutter ball in a big tournament and finding out that he has a pre-arthritic condition developing in his wrist.

Danny's television sports producer and girlfriend Robin encourages him to ask Uncle Joe for a loan of $300,000 to invest in a bowling alley. A typically rude and crude Joe says he will lend the money only if Danny sides with him against his own father. Danny is offended and leaves with his girlfriend, much to the annoyance of the other relatives. They confront Molly later on and she realizes just how conniving and desperate they are for Uncle Joe's fortune.

Uncle Joe asks Danny to visit him at his scrapyard, to apologize for trying to bribe him, but the old man calls a number to place a shipping order to a company he finds out has been closed for 25 years. Realizing that his relatives could declare him incompetent and throw him in a retirement home, he tells Danny that he plans to hand his fortune over to Molly. Danny realizes how much he'd like to inherit his fortune and tells him not to rush into anything.

Danny moves in with Uncle Joe and starts competing for his money, even so far as to sing a Jimmy Durante song that Joe loved him to perform as a little kid. But Molly has other ideas and decides to use her "assets" to outdo Danny and have sex with the elderly gentleman, if only to keep the relatives from getting his money. But after her successful attempt to get Joe in the bedroom, they are interrupted by Danny's father Daniel and he and Danny engage in an heated argument, in which Danny chooses Uncle Joe over him. Molly feels disgusted with herself for almost having sex with Joe and tells Danny she has to leave, but not before Danny promises to look after Joe. However, Danny tells Robin that he'd actually hired an actor to play his "so-called" father, to win favor with his Uncle, and she feels he's become too greedy and leaves him.

At Joe's attorney's office, Danny is ready to inherit Joe's fortune when his relatives arrive with his real father. Danny admits that he's become as bad as the rest of the family. But it soon becomes apparent that Uncle Joe is not only bankrupt, he is in debt of $95,000. After a big scene that involves Frank fighting Danny, the relatives leave and Joe tells Danny that he was simply "playing them" to find out who actually loved him. Danny tells him "nobody loves you" and leaves to make up with Robin. When Danny asks Joe's butler Douglas where Uncle Joe is, Douglas says that he doesn't know. Danny has a change of heart and realizes that no matter what Joe did to trick them, he's still family and loves him. He also tells Robin about it after getting her attention with holding a "He was broke" sign at a sporting event she was covering. Danny makes up with her.

With Joe's ill health, no money, and no place to go, Danny and Robin decide to let Joe stay with them in their apartment. But Joe gives them another surprise and reveals that he still has a fortune and they see Molly and Douglas standing outside. He suggests they stay with him saying "Whatever I own, you own". Danny accepts on the condition that all of the lies and the games stop. Uncle Joe agrees and finishes his final lie by calmly getting off his wheelchair and exiting their apartment whilst a shocked Danny and Robin watch.

Cast

Release

Box office
The movie debuted at No. 2 at the box office behind Ace Ventura: Pet Detective.

Reception
On Rotten Tomatoes, 32% of 19 reviews were positive, with an average rating of 4.70/10 rating. Audiences polled by CinemaScore gave the film a grade "B+" on scale of A to F.

Roger Ebert of the Chicago Sun-Times gave it 2 out of 4 and wrote: "The movie has a promising first act, and then makes the mistake of taking its silly story seriously, with dreadful results: The last two-thirds of this movie plays like a sitcom without the laugh track—or the laughs."

References

External links
 
 
 
 

1994 films
1994 comedy films
American comedy films
1990s English-language films
Universal Pictures films
Imagine Entertainment films
Films with screenplays by Lowell Ganz
Films with screenplays by Babaloo Mandel
Films produced by Brian Grazer
Films directed by Jonathan Lynn
Films about the upper class
Films about families
Films scored by Randy Edelman
Films produced by George Folsey Jr.
1990s American films